Ancylosis decentella is a species of snout moth in the genus Ancylosis. It was described by Émile Louis Ragonot in 1887. It is found in Iran.

References

Moths described in 1887
decentella
Moths of Asia